Hony Smile Gregoria Hilario Estrella (born January 1, 1984 in Santo Domingo, Dominican Republic) is a Dominican actress and presenter.

Early career
During her adolescence, Hony began her career as an announcer on several Dominican FM stations such as Rumba FM, Cadena Espacial, Neón and Viva FM (now Fidelity). She entered television as voiceover of El Despeine, a youth TV program broadcast by Mango TV. There, in 2002 as co-anchor Ventures in Video Hits, a program of music videos.

Her public profile was revitalized when joined with Jochy Santos, one of the most widely known of the Dominican Republic. This includes being co-presenter on El Mismo Golpe con Jochy and Divertido con Jochy, respectively. Thereafter, Hony has been on several television and radio programs such as: Adolescentes en cadena, Contacto joven, Misión Iguazú, Perdone La Hora, Solo para mujeres, Radio Como Yo, Consultando con Ana Simó, Rumbo a los premios Casandra, among others.

In 2007, Hony was selected to lead the first two seasons of the reality show ¿Quién baila mejor?.

Hony credits as an actress include Evita, 85 Chevy, The song of the cicada, ¿Con Quien se Casará Mi Novia? (English: who will marry With My Girlfriend?), Mi amor o mi libertad, Condesa por Amor, Prohibido Seducir a los Casados, Cada Oveja con su Pareja, la versión dominicana de Mujeres asesinas, among others.

Filmography

References

Sources

External links
 
 
 

1984 births
Dominican Republic film actresses
Dominican Republic stage actresses
Dominican Republic television actresses
Dominican Republic television presenters
Living people
People from Santo Domingo
Dominican Republic women television presenters